Sarah Webb may refer to:

 Sarah Webb (sailor) (born 1977), British sailor
 Sarah Webb (painter) (born 1948), American painter
 Sarah Webb (housing professional) (died 2011),British housing professional

See also
Sara Webb (born 1979), American professional ballet dancer